James Rupert Russell Mawdsley is a traditionalist Catholic priest who before seminary was a prisoner of conscience in Burma. He is a dual citizen of the United Kingdom and Australia.

Early life 
Mawdsley was born in 1973. His parents are David and Diana, and he has three siblings. He gave up his study at Bristol University, and while backpacking met Burmese refugees who engaged his interest in the plight of ethnic minorities in Burma.

Although subsequently a declaration of nullity was issued, he married his wife, Elizabeth, in January 2005. They honeymooned in Rome, where their union was blessed by Pope John Paul II.

Burmese activism and imprisonment 
Mawdsley took up teaching English at a Burmese refugee camp, and became further involved when government forces burnt down the school. He was arrested three times for his involvement, and deported three times. The second arrest was in May 1998, for handing out stickers and playing songs for the pro democracy movement. On arrest, he was tortured for fifteen hours, and sentenced to five years imprisonment, which was suspended after 98 days.

He was rearrested a third time in September 1999, for illegal entry and sedition, and was sentenced to seventeen years in jail. His imprisonment was held to be arbitrary by the U.N. Working Group on Arbitrary Detention in 2000. This time, he spent 415 days in solitary confinement, before his release in October 2000, after pressure was exerted by the United Kingdom Foreign Office on the authorities in Myanmar.

External activism and politics 
Mawdsley's memoir of his experiences in Burma, The Heart Must Break: The Fight for Democracy and Truth in Burma, was published in 2001; in the United States, the book was titled The Iron Road: A Stand for Truth and Democracy in Burma.

In February 2003, Mawdsley co authored New Ground, a pamphlet advocating foreign policy based around freedom, dignity and the rule of law. This document has helped give rise to the Conservative Party Human Rights Commission, founded in October 2005. At the 2004 European Parliament Election, Mawdsley was a candidate on the Conservative Party list for the North West England. However, he was placed ninth on the list, so was not one of the three Conservatives who won a seat.

In February 2005, he was selected as the prospective parliamentary candidate for the constituency of Hyndburn, due to the previous candidate deciding not to stand, overseeing unsuccessful campaigns in 1997 and 2001. In the 2005 General Election, which took place in May 2005, he lost to sitting MP Greg Pope by 5,587 votes. Ken Hargreaves supported his bid into becoming the next MP for Hyndburn. His wife suffered an ectopic pregnancy on the eve of the General Election.

Priesthood 
From 2016 to 2022, Mawdsley was a Catholic priest of the Priestly Fraternity of Saint Peter (FSSP), having studied to become a priest at the FSSP seminary at Wigratzbad in Germany. He was ordained to the priesthood on 2 July 2016, and was assistant priest at St Mary's Church, Warrington in Cheshire, England through October 2017. From November 2017 through August 2018, Mawdsley was assigned to the FSSP apostolate in Reading, Berkshire, where he served the Latin Mass centres of Bedford and Chesham Bois. In September 2018, Mawdsley was assigned to the FSSP apostolate in Vienna, Austria. From October 2020 until April 2021, Mawdsley was assigned to the FSSP apostolate in Cologne, Federal Republic of Germany.

In response to Pope Francis' promulgation of his motu proprio Traditionis custodes on 16 July 2021 restricting the use of the traditional Mass and the 18 December 2021 clarification on its implementation released by Bishop Arthur Roche, prefect of the Congregation for Divine Worship and the Discipline of the Sacraments, Mawdsley informed his superiors in the FSSP of his intention to leave the Fraternity in order to be able to speak out against the motu proprio without fear of reprisal from Church authorities. After being suspended a divinis by FSSP leadership for, by his own admission, 'illegitimate absence' from his assigned duties, Mawdsley formally broke with the order in January 2022; shortly thereafter, he released a video on YouTube publicly castigating Francis and the Church hierarchy for their 'intention to eradicate the traditional liturgy.'

Publications 
Adam's Deep Sleep: The Passion of Jesus Christ Prefigured in the Old Testament, New Old, 2022. 
Crushing satan's head: The Virgin Mary's Victory over the Antichrist Foretold in the Old Testament, New Old, 2022.

References

External links 
 Conservative Party Human Rights Commission
 

British human rights activists
British non-fiction writers
British foreign policy writers
British Roman Catholics
1973 births
Living people
British democracy activists
Australian democracy activists
British male writers
Conservative Party (UK) politicians
British traditionalist Catholics
Priestly Fraternity of St. Peter
Male non-fiction writers